La Fiorentina (Italian for a woman from Florence) may refer to:
Clarice Gigli, Italian singer
Vittoria Tesi, Italian singer